Ignacio Alberto Cuba Carrero (born July 31, 1962) is a former marathon runner from Cuba. He won the gold medal at the 1991 Pan American Games and competed for his native country at the 1992 Summer Olympics, where he didn't finish the race.

Achievements
All results regarding marathon, unless stated otherwise

Notes

References
 
 

1962 births
Living people
Cuban male marathon runners
Olympic athletes of Cuba
Athletes (track and field) at the 1991 Pan American Games
Athletes (track and field) at the 1995 Pan American Games
Athletes (track and field) at the 1992 Summer Olympics
Pan American Games medalists in athletics (track and field)
Pan American Games gold medalists for Cuba
Medalists at the 1991 Pan American Games
20th-century Cuban people